Milwaukie Riverfront Park is an  park adjacent to downtown Milwaukie, Oregon, United States.

History
In June 2013, the city secured a $1.2 million grant from the Oregon Marine Board for a new boat launch, parking and restrooms; construction on the improvements will begin in June 2014.

References

External links

 

Milwaukie, Oregon
Municipal parks in Oregon
Parks in Clackamas County, Oregon
Urban public parks